Meshuga, meshugah, meshuggah, meshugge, etc., means "insane" (female: meshuga'at) in Yiddish, borrowed from Hebrew.

The word may also refer to:

Meshuga, a 1994 novel by Isaac Bashevis Singer
Meshuga, an E9 6c graded climbing route at the Black Rocks (Derbyshire), a climbing venue
Meshugah, "king" golem in fantasy novel Feet of Clay by Terry Pratchett
Meshuggah,  Swedish extreme metal band
ha-Meshuggah, "the Madman", a derogatory reference to Muhammad by medieval Jewish writers